Lake Nahwatzel is a body of freshwater located in Mason County in the U.S. state of Washington. The lake is fed by three main sources, which include two unnamed creeks and naturally occurring hot springs. The lake empties into the East Fork of the Satsop River via Outlet Creek. Lake Nahwatzel is one of the warmest lakes in western Washington due to the presence of the aforementioned hot springs. Nearby towns include Shelton and Matlock.

Fishing
Lake Nahwatzel is opened to fishing year-round and is considered to be one of the best bass-fishing lakes in western Washington during the summer months. Twice a year, once in the spring and once in the fall, the lake is stocked with rainbow trout. According to the Washington Department of Fish and Wildlife, April and May or late September and October are the best months for catching rainbow trout.

Geography
Lake Nahwatzel is located in the foothills of the Olympic Mountains which are located on the Olympic Peninsula of Washington State. The location of the lake means that the land is heavily wooded and dotted with many hills and streams.

2008 floatplane accident
On Thursday, July 24, 2008, a floatplane piloted by Mark Storer and his son Brian Storer experienced engine problems soon after taking off from where they had landed on the lake. The plane rose above the tree line but began to descend soon after, eventually crashing into a nearby field, killing the two men on board. The crash sparked a three-acre fire that was contained by local fire fighters within hours.

Controversy
Recently the Simpson Timber Company and their Green Diamond affiliates have begun readying to sell the undeveloped northern shoreline. The north shore of Lake Nahwatzel is currently forestland, and the sale would see new houses built on the shore over the following years. A petition was sent out in 2013 to try to get the community to purchase the property and keep it natural; however, because of a lack of support the petition in its original form failed.

References

Lakes of Washington (state)
Bodies of water of Mason County, Washington